NGC 608 is a lenticular galaxy in the constellation Triangulum. It is estimated to be about 230 million light-years from the Milky Way. It has a diameter of approximately 130,000 light-years. NGC 608 was discovered on November 22, 1827, by astronomer John Herschel.

See also 
 List of NGC objects (1–1000)

References

External links 
 

Lenticular galaxies
Triangulum (constellation)
0608
005913